

161001–161100 

|-id=092
| 161092 Zsigmond ||  || Vilmos Zsigmond (1930–2016), Academy Award-winning Hungarian-American cinematographer || 
|}

161101–161200 

|-bgcolor=#f2f2f2
| colspan=4 align=center | 
|}

161201–161300 

|-id=207
| 161207 Lidz ||  || Adam Lidz (born 1973), American astronomer with the Sloan Digital Sky Survey || 
|-id=215
| 161215 Loveday ||  || Jonathan Loveday (born 1963), British astronomer with the Sloan Digital Sky Survey || 
|-id=230
| 161230 Martinbacháček ||  ||  (c. 1539–1612) was a Czech mathematician and astronomer, rector of Charles University in Prague, and a friend, collaborator and supporter of Johannes Kepler. || 
|-id=278
| 161278 Cesarmendoza ||  || Cesar Mendoza (1962–2008), Venezuelan astrophysicist || 
|}

161301–161400 

|-id=315
| 161315 de Shalit ||  || Amos de-Shalit (1926–1969), an Israeli nuclear physicist || 
|-id=349
| 161349 Mecsek ||  || Mecsek is a mountain range in southern Hungary || 
|-id=371
| 161371 Bertrandou ||  || Bertrand Christophe (born 1976), son of French discoverer Bernard Christophe, named for Bertrandou le Fifre, a character in Edmond Rostand's play Cyrano de Bergerac || 
|}

161401–161500 

|-bgcolor=#f2f2f2
| colspan=4 align=center | 
|}

161501–161600 

|-id=545
| 161545 Ferrando ||  || Rafael Ferrando (born 1966), Spanish astronomer, discoverer of minor planets and founder of the  Pla D'Arguines Astronomical Observatory in Valencia || 
|-id=546
| 161546 Schneeweis ||  || LtCdr (USN) Scott Schneeweis, American early U.S. space program historian, webmaster of † || 
|-id=585
| 161585 Danielhals ||  || Daniel W. Hals (born 1983) is a software engineer at the Johns Hopkins University Applied Physics Laboratory, who served as the Ground Systems Software Lead for the New Horizons Mission to Pluto. || 
|-id=592
| 161592 Sarahhamilton ||  || Sarah A. Hamilton (born 1974) is an operations manager at the Johns Hopkins University Applied Physics Laboratory. She served as the Mission Operations Planning Lead Manager for the New Horizons Mission to Pluto. || 
|}

161601–161700 

|-id=693
| 161693 Attilladanko ||  || Attilla Danko (born 1955), Canadian software designer and amateur astronomer || 
|-id=699
| 161699 Lisahardaway ||  || Lisa Hardaway (1966–2017) was a program manager for Ball Aerospace, who managed the Ralph spectral imaging instrument for the New Horizons Mission to Pluto. || 
|}

161701–161800 

|-id=715
| 161715 Wenchuan ||  || The memory of the 90,000 people who lost their lives in the 2008 Sichuan earthquake (or "Wenchuan earthquake") in China || 
|-id=750
| 161750 Garyladd ||  || Gary Ladd (born 1947) is a photographer and author. He has spent over 40 years shooting iconic images of national parks in and around the Colorado Plateau. Ladd has a deep appreciation for geology and nature that is captured in his stunning photographs. || 
|}

161801–161900 

|-bgcolor=#f2f2f2
| colspan=4 align=center | 
|}

161901–162000 

|-id=962
| 161962 Galchyn ||  || The small village of Galchyn, location of the Andrushivka Astronomical Observatory in Andrushivka, northern Ukraine || 
|-id=975
| 161975 Kincsem || 2007 LO || Kincsem was the most successful Thoroughbred race horse ever, having won 54 races for 54 starts || 
|-id=989
| 161989 Cacus || 1978 CA || Cacus, from Roman mythology, a fire-breathing son of the fire good Vulcan. Cacus was killed by Jupiter's son, Hercules. || 
|}

References 

161001-162000